Dave Dolch (born April 30, 1955) is a former American football coach. He served as the head football coach at was the head football coach at Bowie State University in Bowie, Maryland from 1986 to 1988 and in Morningside College in Sioux City, Iowa from 1989 to 1992, compiling a career college football coaching record of 28–43–3.

Dolch graduated in 1973 from Northeast High School in Pasadena, Maryland. He then played college football at Western Maryland College—now known as McDaniel College—in Westminster, Maryland and was captain of the Green Terror as a senior.

Head coaching record

College

References

1955 births
Living people
American football defensive backs
Bowie State Bulldogs football coaches
Delaware State Hornets football coaches
McDaniel Green Terror football coaches
McDaniel Green Terror football players
Morningside Mustangs football coaches
Northern Colorado Bears football coaches
High school football coaches in Maryland
People from Pasadena, Maryland
Coaches of American football from Maryland
Players of American football from Maryland